Acanthinomyia is a genus of flies in the family Stratiomyidae.

Species
Acanthinomyia elongata (Wiedemann, 1824)
Acanthinomyia longa (Wiedemann, 1830)
Acanthinomyia plana (Walker, 1854)

References

Stratiomyidae
Brachycera genera
Diptera of North America
Diptera of South America